"Take Care of You" is a song by British singer and songwriter Ella Henderson. The song was released on digital download on 12 June 2020. The song peaked at number 50 on the UK Singles Chart and remained on the chart for 12 weeks.

Background
Talking about the song, Henderson said, "When I wrote Take Care of You I couldn't put into words how I was feeling, but alongside two of my favourite writers in the world, Julia and Justin, they helped me turn my thoughts into song. This song is for everyone I love, as well as a message of self-care - a personal reminder to look after myself, both mentally and physically."

Live performances 
Henderson performed the song for the first time on Sunday Brunch on 21 June 2020. Other major performances of the single include her performance on Martin & Roman's Sunday Best, as well as Blue Peter. Henderson performed the song on Top of the Pops 2020 Christmas special.

Music video
A music video to accompany the release of "Take Care of You" was first released onto YouTube on 12 June 2020.

Personnel
Credits adapted from Tidal.
 Daniel Blume – producer
 Noel Zancanella – producer, composer
 Ella Henderson – composer, lead vocals
 Julia Michaels – composer
 Justin Tranter – composer
 Ryan Tedder – backing vocals
 Brent Kolatalo – additional production
 Dom Lyttle – additional production
 Joris Muir – additional production
 Ken Lewis – additional production
 Kevin Grainger – mixer
 Jordan Riley – vocal production

Charts

Certifications

References

2020 singles
2020 songs
Ella Henderson songs
Songs written by Ella Henderson
Asylum Records singles